West Virginia Route 92 is a north–south state highway located in West Virginia, US. The southern terminus of the route is at U.S. Route 60 in White Sulphur Springs a half-mile northwest of Interstate 64 exit 181. The northern terminus is at West Virginia Route 7 in Reedsville.

Major intersections

References

092
Transportation in Barbour County, West Virginia
Transportation in Greenbrier County, West Virginia
Transportation in Pocahontas County, West Virginia
Transportation in Preston County, West Virginia
Transportation in Randolph County, West Virginia